Clay County is a county in the U.S. state of West Virginia. As of the 2020 census, the population was 8,051. Its county seat is Clay. The county was founded in 1858 and named in honor of Henry Clay, famous American statesman, member of the United States Senate from Kentucky and United States Secretary of State in the 19th century.

Clay County is part of the Charleston, WV Metropolitan Statistical Area.

Geography

In 1863, West Virginia's counties were divided into civil townships, with the intention of encouraging local government.  This proved impractical in the heavily rural state, and in 1872 the townships were converted into magisterial districts.  Clay County was divided into four districts: Buffalo, Henry, Pleasant, and Union.  A fifth district, Otter, was created from part of Henry in 1876.  Between 1990 and 2000, these districts were consolidated into Districts A, B, and C. Though it does have access to an interstate highway, the county has no traffic lights or public transportation.

Major highways
 Interstate 79
 West Virginia Route 4
 West Virginia Route 16
 West Virginia Route 36

Adjacent counties
Calhoun County (north)
Braxton County (northeast)
Nicholas County (southeast)
Kanawha County (west)
Roane County (northwest)

Demographics

2000 census
As of the census of 2000, there were 10,330 people, 4,020 households, and 2,942 families living in the county.  The population density was 30 people per square mile (12/km2).  There were 4,836 housing units at an average density of 14 per square mile (5/km2).  The racial makeup of the county was 98.22% White, 0.08% Black or African American, 0.71% Native American, 0.02% Asian, 0.09% from other races, and 0.89% from two or more races.  0.41% of the population were Hispanic or Latino of any race.

There were 4,020 households, out of which 33.50% had children under the age of 18 living with them, 58.20% were married couples living together, 10.40% had a female householder with no husband present, and 26.80% were non-families. 24.30% of all households were made up of individuals, and 11.40% had someone living alone who was 65 years of age or older.  The average household size was 2.55 and the average family size was 3.01.

In the county, the population was spread out, with 25.60% under the age of 18, 9.00% from 18 to 24, 27.50% from 25 to 44, 24.20% from 45 to 64, and 13.70% who were 65 years of age or older.  The median age was 37 years. For every 100 females, there were 97.90 males.  For every 100 females age 18 and over, there were 97.30 males.

The median income for a household in the county was $22,120, and the median income for a family was $27,137. Males had a median income of $30,161 versus $16,642 for females. The per capita income for the county was $12,021.  About 24.40% of families and 27.50% of the population were below the poverty line, including 37.00% of those under age 18 and 15.00% of those age 65 or over.

2010 census
As of the 2010 United States census, there were 9,386 people, 3,728 households, and 2,566 families living in the county. The racial makeup of the county was 98.8% white, 0.2% American Indian, 0.1% black or African American, 0.1% Asian, 0.1% from other races, and 0.8% from two or more races. Those of Hispanic or Latino origin made up 0.4% of the population. In terms of ancestry, 17.6% were Irish, 14.7% were English, 13.2% were German, 11.0% were American, and 5.0% were Dutch.

Of the 3,728 households, 31.3% had children under the age of 18 living with them, 53.6% were married couples living together, 9.7% had a female householder with no husband present, 31.2% were non-families, and 26.2% of all households were made up of individuals. The average household size was 2.50 and the average family size was 3.00. The median age was 41.5 years.

The median income for a household in the county was $30,789 and the median income for a family was $40,634. Males had a median income of $42,269 versus $24,402 for females. The per capita income for the county was $16,205. About 22.4% of families and 23.7% of the population were below the poverty line, including 29.3% of those under age 18 and 21.1% of those age 65 or over.

Politics
Clay County was reliably Democratic through the 1990s, but it has shifted to being sharply Republican in recent years.

In popular culture
Clay County is also the birthplace of the Golden Delicious Apple. The original tree was found on the Mullins' family farm in Clay County, West Virginia, United States and was locally known as Mullin's Yellow Seedling and Annit apple.

See also
National Register of Historic Places listings in Clay County, West Virginia

References

External links
Clay County Schools
WVGenWeb Clay County

 
1858 establishments in Virginia
Populated places established in 1858
Charleston, West Virginia metropolitan area
Counties of Appalachia